Gori is a city in eastern Georgia, which serves as the regional capital of Shida Kartli and is located at the confluence of two rivers, the Mtkvari and the Liakhvi. Gori is the fifth most populous city in Georgia. Its name comes from the Georgian word gora (გორა), meaning "heap", "hill", or "mountain".

A settlement known here from the Hellenistic period, with the Gori Fortress built at least in 7th century, it received town status in the 12th century. Gori was an important military stronghold in the Middle Ages and maintains a strategic importance due to its location on the principal highway connecting eastern and western parts of Georgia. In the course of its history, Gori has been invaded by the armies of regional powers several times. The city was occupied by Russian troops during the 2008 Russo–Georgian War.

Gori is also known as the birthplace of the Soviet leader and politician Joseph Stalin, ballistic missile designer Aleksandr Nadiradze, and philosopher Merab Mamardashvili.

Geography and climate
The climate is humid continental, transitional from moderately warm steppe to moderately humid. Summer is usually hot. The maximum precipitation falls in May and minimum in February. Precipitation here averages 603 mm.

History

The territory of Gori has been populated since the early Bronze Age. According to medieval Georgian chronicles, the town of Gori was founded by King David IV (r. 1089–1125) who settled refugees from Armenia there. However, the fortress of Gori (Goris-Tsikhe) appears to have been in use already in the 7th century, and archaeological evidence indicates the existence of an urban community in Classical Antiquity. In 1299, Gori was captured by the Alan tribesmen fleeing the Mongol conquest of their original homeland in the North Caucasus. The Georgian king George V recovered the town in 1320, pushing the Alans back over the Caucasus mountains.

With the downfall of the medieval Georgian kingdom, Gori – strategically located at the crossroads of major transit routes – was frequently targeted by foreign invaders, and changed its masters on several occasions. It was first taken and sacked by Uzun Hassan of the Ak Koyunlu in 1477, followed by Tahmasp I of Persia in the mid-16th century. By the end of that century, Gori briefly passed to the Ottomans through the 1578–90 Ottoman–Persian War, and became their major outpost in Georgia until being recovered by the Georgians under Simon I of Kartli after heavy fighting in 1599. The town was once again garrisoned by the Persians under Shah Abbas I in 1614. Following successive occupations by the Ottomans (1723–35) and Persians (1735–40s), Gori returned to Georgian control under the kings Teimuraz II and Erekle II whose efforts helped to advance economy and culture in the town. Following the Russian annexation of Georgia, Gori was granted the status of a town within the Gori Uyezd of the Tiflis Governorate in 1801. It grew in size and population throughout the 19th century. A plan of 1824 shows the town on the hill slopes below the citadel, and a mote around it. The town was destroyed in the 1920 earthquake, and almost completely rebuilt in the Soviet period. An important industrial center in Soviet times, Gori suffered from an economic collapse and the outflow of the population during the years of a post-Soviet crisis of the 1990s.

Gori is close to the Georgian–Ossetian conflict zone. It is connected to breakaway South Ossetia's capital Tskhinvali via a railroad spur which has been defunct since the early 1990s. Since the 2000s, Georgia has increased the military infrastructure in and around the city. Thus, the Central Military Hospital was relocated from Tbilisi to Gori and re-equipped in October 2006. On January 18, 2008, Georgia's second NATO-standard base to accommodate the 1st Infantry Brigade (Georgia) of the Georgian Ground Forces was established at Gori. The Georgian Agrarian Science Academy Branch was established in the city in 1995; this became Sukhishvili University in 2003.

2008 conflict

In the 2008 Russo-Georgian War, the town came under aerial attack by the Russian Air Force from the outset of the conflict. Military targets and residential districts of Gori were hit by the airstrikes, resulting in civilian injuries and deaths. Human Rights Watch (HRW) claimed that Russian forces had indiscriminately deployed cluster bombs in civilian areas around Gori. According to HRW, on August 12 Russian forces dropped cluster bombs in the center of Gori, killing 11 civilians and wounding dozens more. Russian military officials deny using cluster munitions in the conflict, calling the HRW assertion "slanderous" and questioning the HRW's objectivity. Numerous unexploded "bomblets" have been found by locals and HRW employees.

By August 11, Georgian military personnel, government, and most residents had fled the city, which was then captured and occupied by the Russian military and South Ossetian separatist militia. HRW accused the militia of unleashing a campaign of looting, arson, kidnapping and other attacks against the remaining civilian population. The Russian and South Ossetian forces withdrew from the city on August 22, 2008. The following day Units of the Georgian Army returned to Gori. However, Russian checkpoints remained near Gori as well as in so-called buffer zones near the borders with Abkhazia and South Ossetia.

Demographics

Landmarks

Gori and its environs house several notable cultural and historical landmarks. Although for many foreigners Gori is principally known as the birthplace of Joseph Stalin, in Georgian historical memory the city has long been associated with its citadel, the Gori Fortress, which is built on a cliffy hill overlooking the central part of the modern city. On another hill stands the 18th century St. George's church of Gorijvari, a popular place of pilgrimage. The famous ancient rock-hewn town of Uplistsikhe and the 7th century Ateni Sioni Church are located not far from Gori.

Stalin's association with the city is emphasized by the Joseph Stalin Museum in downtown Gori and, until recently, the Stalin monument in front of the Gori City Hall, one of the few such monuments to survive Nikita Khrushchev's de-Stalinization program. The monument was a source of controversy in a newly independent Georgia in the 1990s, but for several years the post-communist government acceded to the Gori citizens' request and left the statue untouched. It was ultimately removed on June 25, 2010. However, on 20 December 2012, the municipal assembly of Gori voted to reinstate the monument.

Administrative divisions
The city is divided into 11 administrative districts, they are:

Notable people
Anastasia Eristavi-Khoshtaria (1868-1951), novelist
Joseph Stalin (1878–1953), 2nd Leader of the Soviet Union and 4th Premier of the Soviet Union
Simon Arshaki Ter-Petrosian (1882–1922), revolutionary
Vano Muradeli (1908–1970), composer
Aleksandre Machavariani (1913–1995), composer
Aleksandr Nadiradze (1914–1987), inventor
Edvard Mirzoyan (1921–2012), composer
Sulkhan Tsintsadze (1925–1991), composer
Merab Mamardashvili (1930–1990), philosopher
Giorgi Tenadze (born 1962), wrestler
Vazha Tarkhnishvili (born 1971), footballer
Georgi Kandelaki (born 1974), boxer
Lasha Shavdatuashvili (born 1992), wrestler
Geno Petriashvili (born 1994), wrestler
Oto Nemsadze (born 1989), singer
Vladimer Khinchegashvili (born 1991), wrestler, Olympic & World Champion

Important sights 

 Gori Fortress

 Gori Cathedral of Saint Mary
 Gori State Historical-Ethnographic Museum
 Joseph Stalin State Museum
 House of Amilakhvris
 Monument to Nikoloz Baratashvili
 Monument to Iakob Gogebashvili
 Gori Pedagogical Institute
 Gori State Drama Theater
 Gori State Historical-Ethnographic Museum
 Gorijvari
 Erekle Baths
 Monument to Giorgi Eristavi
 Monument to Nico Lomouri
 Military city
 Theological School

References

External links

Official Site
Map of Gori
On Gori, Georgia
Live Web Cam

 
Tiflis Governorate